The 2017–18  Nebraska Cornhuskers men's basketball team represented the University of Nebraska in the 2017–18 NCAA Division I men's basketball season. The Cornhuskers were led by sixth-year coach head coach Tim Miles and played their home games at Pinnacle Bank Arena in Lincoln, Nebraska as members of the Big Ten Conference. They finished the season 22–11, 13–5 in Big Ten play to finish in a tie for fourth place. As the No. 4 seed in the Big Ten tournament, they lost in the quarterfinals to Michigan. Despite winning 13 Big Ten games, the Cornhuskers did not receive a bid to the NCAA tournament, but did receive a bid to the National Invitation Tournament. However, they lost in the first round of the NIT to Mississippi State.

Previous season
The Cornhuskers finished the 2016–17 season 12–19, 6–12 in Big Ten play to finish in a tie for 12th place in conference. As the No. 12 seed in the Big Ten tournament, they lost in the first round to Penn State. This marked the fourth losing season in five years for coach Tim Miles. However, following the season, Nebraska athletic director Shawn Eichorst indicated that Tim Miles would return as head coach for Nebraska.

Offseason

Departures

Arrivals

2017 recruiting class

Roster

}

Schedule and results
The 2018 Big Ten tournament was held at Madison Square Garden in New York City. Due to the Big East's use of that venue for their conference tournament, the Big Ten tournament took place one week earlier than usual, ending the week before Selection Sunday. This meant qualifying teams had nearly two weeks off before the NCAA tournament. As a result, the Big Ten regular season began in mid-December. Coaches requested that no Big Ten game be scheduled between Christmas and New Year's Day; accordingly, each team played two conference games in early December before finishing non-conference play.

On October 18, 2017, the school announced that it would play a charity exhibition game against Mississippi State on October 22 in Starkville, Mississippi to raise money for hurricane victims.

|-
!colspan=9 style=|Exhibition

|-
!colspan=9 style=|Regular season

|-
!colspan=9 style=|Big Ten tournament

|-
!colspan=9 style=|NIT

References

Nebraska
Nebraska Cornhuskers men's basketball seasons
Corn
Nebraska
Nebraska